Filippo Costa (born 21 May 1995) is an Italian footballer who plays as a left midfielder for  club Foggia on loan from Napoli.

Club career
Costa started his career in his native Veneto club Chievo. In July 2015 he was signed by English club Bournemouth. However, in January 2016 he returned to Chievo.

In January 2017 he was loaned to SPAL with an option to buy. In June 2017 SPAL excised the option for €1 million transfer fee.

On 13 July 2019, Costa signed to Napoli. On 15 July 2019, he joined Bari on loan until 30 June 2021. On 18 September 2020, Napoli terminated the Bari loan and sent him on loan to Serie B club Virtus Entella. On 10 January 2022, he joined Parma in Serie B on loan until the end of the season, with an option to buy. On 1 September 2022, Costa was loaned to Foggia.

References

External links
 

1995 births
Sportspeople from the Province of Vicenza
Footballers from Veneto
Living people
Italian footballers
Italy youth international footballers
A.C. ChievoVerona players
Pisa S.C. players
AFC Bournemouth players
S.P.A.L. players
S.S.C. Bari players
Virtus Entella players
S.S.C. Napoli players
Parma Calcio 1913 players
Calcio Foggia 1920 players
Serie A players
Serie B players
Serie C players
Association football defenders
Italian expatriate footballers
Expatriate footballers in England
Italian expatriate sportspeople in England